The Oregon City Carnegie Library is an historic library building located in Oregon City, Oregon, United States. It was added to the National Register of Historic Places in 2014. The building was completed in 1913 and underwent a major renovation and expansion in 2015.

See also
 List of Carnegie libraries in Oregon
 National Register of Historic Places listings in Clackamas County, Oregon

References

External links
 

1913 establishments in Oregon
Buildings and structures in Oregon City, Oregon
Carnegie libraries in Oregon
Libraries on the National Register of Historic Places in Oregon
Library buildings completed in 1913
National Register of Historic Places in Clackamas County, Oregon